Bhavya Gowda is an Indian-born model.

Career 

She was a finalist of the Miss England Earth in 2009. She was also Miss India Personality in 2002 and Miss Commonwealth International 2010 finalist for Asia Pacific.

She has appeared in a music video produced by Jazzy B and Sunny Dee. She has worked with photographer Simon Walden of Bride and Prejudice fame.[3] She started her acting in the Geetha Serial in Colors Kannada and made her screen debut in Dear Kanmani.

References

External links
 http://www.cinespot.net/gallery/v/South+Cinema/Actress/Bhavya+Gowda+Actress+Photos/
 http://www.raagalahari.com/actress/10253/bhavya-gowda-super-spicy-stills.aspx
 http://chennaionline.com/movies/gallery/Actress/Actress-Bhavya-Gowda-Photoshoot-Gallery/20130121100526.col#1.html
 https://web.archive.org/web/20120328110408/http://www.preetd.com/gallery
 https://web.archive.org/web/20140714171606/http://www.asianabridal.com/asian-bridal-gallery#.U7qN5_QW3M4
 https://web.archive.org/web/20140714195128/http://www.lubnarafiq.com/galleries/bridal.phuse
 http://www.paulwestphotography.com/

Living people
Female models from Karnataka
People from Mandya district
Alumni of the University of Northampton
Alumni of the University of Leeds
1992 births